Juan Francisco Bauza (born 3 May 1996) is an Argentine professional footballer who plays as a winger for Liga I club FC U Craiova, which he captains.

Career
Bauza started his career with Argentine Primera División side Colón. His first appearance for the club came on 22 October 2016 in loss at home to Patronato. He made three further appearances in the 2016–17 season, prior to being loaned out for the following campaign to Juventud Unida. He scored the first two goals of his senior career in April 2018 against Deportivo Riestra and Santamarina respectively. Bauza signed for fellow club Gimnasia y Esgrima on loan on 12 July 2018. One goal in twenty-two games followed, as they reached the promotion play-offs.

On 29 July 2019, Bauza headed to Poland to join Polish first division outfit Górnik Zabrze on a season-long loan; having trained since June. He made his bow in a league defeat away to Wisła Kraków on 5 August. Bauza played in the fourth tier on 11 August for their reserve team Górnik II Zabrze, notably scoring against Ruch Zdzieszowice in III liga. On 17 February 2020, the Polish club confirmed that the loan deal had been terminated and that Bauza had joined Romanian club FK Csíkszereda. He had impressed the Romanian side whilst playing against them for the Polish outfit in a friendly match on 25 January.

Bauza scored five goals in eight friendlies upon joining Miercurea Ciuc, prior to making his competitive debut in Liga II during a 6–0 home loss to UTA Arad on 24 February. He initially signed for just six months, though soon extended his stay there for another twelve months.

In August 2022, FC U Craiova's president Adrian Mititelu rejected a €2 million bid from FCSB. On 14 September 2022, Bauza signed a contract extension, with his release clause set at €8 million.

Personal life
His father, Marcelo Bauza was also a footballer.

Career statistics

Club

References

External links

1996 births
Living people
Sportspeople from Entre Ríos Province
Argentine footballers
Association football midfielders
Argentine expatriate footballers
Expatriate footballers in Poland
Expatriate footballers in Romania
Argentine expatriate sportspeople in Poland
Argentine expatriate sportspeople in Romania
Argentine Primera División players
Primera Nacional players
Ekstraklasa players
III liga players
Liga II players
Liga I players
Club Atlético Colón footballers
Juventud Unida de Gualeguaychú players
Gimnasia y Esgrima de Mendoza footballers
Górnik Zabrze players
FK Csíkszereda Miercurea Ciuc players
FC U Craiova 1948 players